Zvi Lurie (1 June 1906 – 21 May 1968) was a Jewish political figure in Mandatory Palestine. A member of the Jewish National Council, he was amongst the signatories of the Israeli declaration of independence.

Biography
Zvi Lurie was born in Łódź in the Russian Empire (today in Poland). He  immigrated to Mandatory Palestine in 1924. Lurie was a founder of kibbutz Ein Shemer.

Zionist and political activism
Lurie was a member of  Hashomer Hatzair, serving as its general secretary between 1935 and 1937. He was a member of the Jewish National Council on behalf of Hashomer Hatzair, and was co-opted into the Provisional State Council following Israel's declaration of independence in May 1948. He also helped establish Kol Yisrael, which broadcast the declaration.

After signing the declaration, Lurie left Israel to work on strengthening ties between Israel and the Jewish people with the Jewish Agency as a representative of Mapam (of which Hashomer Hatzair was a part). He died in 1968.

References

External links 
The Central Zionist Archives in Jerusalem site. Office of Zvi Lurie (S64)

Signatories of the Israeli Declaration of Independence
Jewish National Council members
1906 births
1968 deaths
Politicians from Łódź
People from Piotrków Governorate
Jews from the Russian Empire
Polish emigrants to Mandatory Palestine
Mapam politicians
Jewish socialists
Hashomer Hatzair members